The Tigress is a 1992 German film directed and written by Karin Howard, and based on Walter Serner's novel. It marked George Peppard's final film role. The film follows a penniless con man (James Remar), who teams up with the eponymous prostitute (Valentina Vargas).

Plot
In a sordid night club in 1920s Berlin, the penniless con man Andrei catches the eye of the fiery whore Pauline, known as The Tigress. Underworld boss Harry considers her his property, but she spends the next two days in bed with Andrei. To escape Harry's revenge, the two disappear to neighbouring Czechoslovakia and book into a hotel in the resort of Carlsbad. They have the jewels Pauline has accumulated during her career, which are used to buy smart clothes and attend smart evenings in the casino. Andrei promotes himself to a baron and introduces Pauline as a film star, stressing that they are not married (and privately stressing to Pauline that this is all a business venture and he is not going to fall in love with her). She soon acquires admirers, an Austrian count and a Texan oil man. Playing them off against each other, she eventually succumbs to the Texan, who is by far the richer. Andrei's plan is to burst in and challenge the Texan to a duel, confident that the man would rather pay a large amount of money than lose his life, but on barging into the room he discovers Pauline has vanished. She has been tipped off by a friend in Berlin that Harry is on a train to find her. Unaware of this, Andrei goes to the station and is spotted by Harry, who starts shooting at him. Jumping onto a moving train, Andrei is robbed of all he has by some villains and thrown out beside a road. Along the road comes Pauline, looking for him because she has been in love with him all along.

Cast

External links

1992 crime thriller films
1990s erotic thriller films
Films about con artists
Films based on Czech novels
Films set in the 1920s
English-language German films
German crime thriller films
German erotic thriller films
1990s English-language films
1990s German films